The Freyellidae are a family of deep-sea-dwelling starfish. It is one of two families in the order Brisingida.
The majority of species in this family are found in Antarctic waters and near Australia. Other species have been found near New Zealand and the United States.

Taxonomy
The starfish Brisinga endecacnemos was discovered in deep water off Norway in 1856, followed by another abyssal species, Brisinga coronata, now Hymenodiscus coronata. A new order, Brisingida, was erected to accommodate these, consisting of a single family, Brisingidae. Since then dozens of new species have been described from deep water habitats and in 1986, the American zoologist Maureen Downey split the family on morphological and behavioural grounds, creating the new family Freyellidae.

Characteristics
Members of this family have a small, Ophiurida-like disc, clearly demarcated from the arms, which number more than five. The disc is approximately circular with a rim of fused plates which gives rigidity. The madreporite is near the margin of the disc. The arms are long and tapering with the ratio of the arm length to the disc radius being greater than 6/1. There is an acute angle between the arms . After a narrow cylindrical portion, the part of the arms closest to the disc accommodates the gonadal tissues and widens out somewhat. Beyond this area, the arms taper to a long point. In all these aspects members of this family resemble members of Brisingidae, the other family in the order Brisingida. They differ from Brisingidae in having the interradial arcs curved, having smaller madreporites, having bare interadial plates on the disc, having the aboral (upper) surface of the arms continuous with the disc, and having the plates on the proximal parts of the arms abutting rather than overlapping each other.

Biology
Because of the way their plates abut on the proximal ends of their arms, Freyellids have not been observed to raise their arms vertically above their discs, as do Brisingidae, and some are probably not suspension feeders. Some do however raise the distal portions of their arms, the parts beyond the gonadal regions.

Genera and species
The World Asteroida Database lists the following genera and species:
Family Freyellidae
 Genus Astrocles Fisher, 1917 — three species
 Astrocles actinodetus
 Astrocles djakonovi
 Astrocles japonicus
 Genus Belgicella Ludwig, 1903 — monotypic
 Belgicella racovitzana
 Genus Colpaster Sladen, 1889 — two species
 Colpaster edwardsii
 Colpaster scutigerula
 Genus Freyastera Downey, 1986 — six species
 Freyastera benthophila
 Freyastera digitata
 Freyastera mexicana
 Freyastera mortenseni
 Freyastera sexradiata
 Freyastera tuberculata
 Genus Freyella Perrier, 1885 (synonym: Freyellidea, Fisher, 1917) — 29 species 
 Freyella attenuata Sladen, 1889
 Freyella breviispina (H.L. Clark, 1920)
 Freyella dimorpha Sladen, 1889
 Freyella drygalskii (Döderlein, 1928)
 Freyella echinata Sladen, 1889
 Freyella elegans (Verrill, 1884)
 Freyella felleyra McKnight, 2006
 Freyella flabellispina Korovchinsky & Galkin, 1984
 Freyella formosa Korovchinsky, 1976
 Freyella fragilissima Sladen, 1889
 Freyella giardi Koehler, 1907
 Freyella heroina Sladen, 1889
 Freyella hexactis Baranova, 1957
 Freyella indica Koehler, 1909
 Freyella insignis Ludwig, 1905
 Freyella kurilokamchatica Korovchinsky, 1976
 Freyella loricata Korovchinsky & Galkin, 1984
 Freyella macropedicellaria Korovchinsky & Galkin, 1984
 Freyella microplax (Fisher, 1917)
 Freyella microspina Verrill, 1894
 Freyella mutabila Korovchinsky, 1976
 Freyella octoradiata (H.L. Clark, 1920)
 Freyella oligobrachia (H.L. Clark, 1920)
 Freyella pacifica Ludwig, 1905
 Freyella pennata Sladen, 1889
 Freyella propinqua Ludwig, 1905
 Freyella recta Koehler, 1907
 Freyella remex Sladen, 1889
 Freyella vitjazi Korovchinsky & Galkin, 1984
 Genus Freyellaster Fisher 1918 — five species
 Freyellaster fecundus  
 Freyellaster intermedius 
 Freyellaster polycnema  
 Freyellaster scalaris
 Freyellaster spatulifer

References

Other sources
 Clark, A.M. and Mah, C. (2001). An index of names of recent Asteroidea, part 4. Forcipulatida and Brisingida, in: Jangoux, M.; Lawrence, J.M. (Ed.) (2001). Echinoderm Studies, 6: pp. 229–347
 Mah, C.; Hansson, H. (2013). Freyella Perrier, 1885. In: Mah, C.L. (2013) World Asteroidea database. Accessed through: Freyella Perrier, 1885 at the World Register of Marine Species on 2013-11-25

Brisingida
Echinoderm families